Oduber may refer to:

Dangui Oduber (born 1978), Aruban Politician, Minister of Tourism and Public Health in the Second Wever-Croes Cabinet
Marjorie Elliott de Oduber (1925–2015), Canadian-born Costa Rican musician and public figure
Marvin Oduber (born 1976), Dutch financial advisor and serial entrepreneur
Nelson Oduber (born 1947), Aruban politician, the 2nd Prime Minister of Aruba
Randolph Oduber (born 1989), professional baseball outfielder
Ryan Oduber (born 1997), Arubian professional baseball baseball pitcher
Daniel Oduber Quirós (1921–1991), Costa Rican politician, lawyer, philosopher, poet, and essayist

See also
Daniel Oduber Airport or Guanacaste Airport, one of four international airports in Costa Rica
Dr. Horacio E. Oduber Hospital, 320-bed Catholic hospital on the island of Aruba
Boduberu